Juan Antolínez Brecianos de la Rivera was a Roman Catholic prelate who served as Bishop of Giovinazzo (1549–1574).

Biography
On 25 October 1549, Juan Antolínez Brecianos de la Rivera was appointed by Pope Paul III as Bishop of Giovinazzo. In 1549, he was consecrated bishop by Jean Lunel, Auxiliary Bishop of Bayeux. He served as Bishop of Giovinazzo until his resignation in 1574. He died on 21 September 1581.

References

External links and additional sources
 (for Chronology of Bishops) 
 (for Chronology of Bishops) 

16th-century Italian Roman Catholic bishops
1581 deaths
Bishops appointed by Pope Paul III